Buciumeni is a commune in Dâmbovița County, Muntenia, Romania. It is composed of three villages: Buciumeni, Dealu Mare and Valea Leurzii.

References

Communes in Dâmbovița County
Localities in Muntenia